The Roman Catholic Diocese of Penonomé (erected 18 December 1993) is a suffragan diocese of the Archdiocese of Panamá.

Ordinaries
Uriah Adolphus Ashley Maclean (1993–2014)
Edgardo Muñoz Cedeño (2015)

See also
 Catholic Church in Panama

References

External links
 

Penonome
Penonome
Penonome
Penonomé, Coclé
1993 establishments in Panama
Roman Catholic Ecclesiastical Province of Panamá